Jason Elliott Ferguson (born 31 May 1969) is an English former professional snooker player and current chairman of the World Professional Billiards and Snooker Association. He reached the World Snooker Championship on three occasions, and was for four seasons ranked in the world's top 32 players, reaching a peak position of #28.

In 1998 Ferguson was elected to the board of the WPBSA, and became chairman of the organisation in 2001. After retiring as a professional player and leaving his position on the WPBSA, he served as the mayor of Ollerton and Boughton between 2009 and 2010. In July 2010 Ferguson was re-elected as chairman of the WPBSA, a position he has held since. In 2022, it was confirmed that Ferguson would continue serving as chairman for at least four more years.

Playing career
Ferguson turned professional in 1990. Two years later he qualified for the World Snooker Championships, losing in the first round, and reached the last 16 of the UK Championship. He reached the same stage of six more ranking events but never progressed beyond that stage.

Ferguson again qualified for the World Championship in 1996, again losing in the first round. His final World Championship appearance came in 1998, when he lost 8–10 to eventual champion John Higgins in the first round. He spent a total of four years ranked among the world's top 32 players, reaching his highest ranking of #28 in the 1994/95 season.

Although Ferguson continued to play professionally for a further six years, his form suffered due to his increased workload after being elected to the WPBSA board. He retired in 2004.

Performance and rankings timeline

Career finals

Non-ranking finals: 2

Pro-am finals: 1 (1 title)

Amateur finals: 1

Snooker administration
In December 1998 Ferguson was elected alongside Steve Davis and Dennis Taylor to the WPBSA's seven-person board, at the time led by Rex Williams. This appointment coincided with a period of difficulty between old and new board members. An attempt by Ferguson, Davis and Taylor to remove Williams and Bob Close in August 1999 failed, and a counter-motion saw the three voted off the board, although this was later reversed.

Ferguson became the organisation's chairman in December 2001, replacing Mark Wildman. Ferguson was at the time ranked #56 in the world. He was criticised for endorsing the board's decision to fire chief executive Jim McKenzie one week after becoming chairman.

After several years away from the post, Ferguson was re-elected as chairman of the WPBSA following a board meeting in July 2010. He survived a vote of confidence in December 2010 by a margin of 31 votes to three. In 2022, following an independent review, the WBPSA confirmed that Ferguson would continue as chairman at least until 2026.

Other roles
In May 2009 Ferguson was elected as mayor of the civil parish of Ollerton and Boughton having previously spent two years from late 2006 as a town councillor in Ollerton. He was replaced as mayor by Irene Miller in May 2010.

Ferguson also owns the bicycle repair shop called Wheels ‘n’ Things. He was a non-executive director of the Sherwood Energy Village, an ecologically sustainable village on the site of a former coal mine in Ollerton; while the site still exists, the organisation went into liquidation in 2010.

References

English snooker players
Sportspeople from Mansfield
Mayors of places in Nottinghamshire
1969 births
Living people
Snooker referees and officials
People from Ollerton
Sportspeople from Nottinghamshire
English referees and umpires